Vo Rogue Plate is a registered Brisbane Racing Club Group 3 Thoroughbred horse race for three-year-olds run at set weights over a distance of 1350 metres at Doomben Racecourse, Brisbane, Queensland, Australia in late December or early January. Total prizemoney is A$300,000.

History

Name
The race is named after Champion Queensland Racing Hall of Fame inductee, Vo Rogue, who was known for his front running style.

Distance
2006–2013 – 1350 metres
2014 – 1300 metres
2017 – 1350 metres

Grade
2006–2008 - Listed Race
2008 onwards - Group 3

Venue
2006–2013 - Doomben Racecourse
2014–2015 - Gold Coast Racecourse (due to renovations at Eagle Farm the BRC moved the event)
2016 - Eagle Farm Racecourse
2017 - Doomben Racecourse

Winners

 2022 - Tiger Heart
2021 - Apache Chase
2019 - Alligator Blood
2018 - Boomsara
2017 - Pierata
2016 - Winning Rupert
2015 - Madotti
2014 - Mywayorthehighway
2013 - Enquare
2012 - Lucky Hussler
2011 - Punch On
2010 - Bennys Buttons
2009 - Graceful Anna
2008 (Dec.) - Youthful Jack
†2008 (Mar.) - Dirty
2006 - Sequential Charm 

† Race rescheduled due to equine influenza.

See also
 List of Australian Group races
 Group races

References

Horse races in Australia
Flat horse races for three-year-olds